Vresse-sur-Semois (literally Vresse on Semois) is a municipality of Wallonia located in the province of Namur, Belgium. 

The municipality consists of the following districts: Alle, Bagimont, Bohan, Chairière, Laforêt, Membre, Mouzaive, Nafraiture, Orchimont, Pussemange, Sugny, and Vresse.

On its south and west, the municipality borders the Ardennes department of France.

See also
 List of protected heritage sites in Vresse-sur-Semois

References

External links
 
Official website (in French)
Bohan sur Semois village in Vresse community website

Municipalities of Namur (province)